Madge is a female given name, a short form of Margaret, Marjorie, and Maggie. Madge may refer to:

Actresses:
 Madge Bellamy (1899–1990), American movie actress born Margaret Derden Philpott
 Madge Blake (1899–1969), American character actress most famous for her role as Aunt Harriet Cooper on the TV series Batman
 Madge Evans (born Margherita Evans; 1909–1981), American film actress who began her career as a child actress and model
 Dame Madge Kendal (1848–1935), English actress and theatre manager
 Madge Lessing (1873–1966), English singer and actress
 Madge Sinclair (1938–1995), Jamaican-born American actress
 Madge Titheradge (1887–1961), Australian actress

Singers:
 Madonna, American singer and actress, known as "Madge" in the British press.

In other fields:
 Madeleine Albright (born 1937), first female Secretary of State in the United States
 Madge Easton Anderson (1896–1992), Scottish lawyer
 Madge Bester (1963–2018), formerly the world's shortest living woman
 Madeline McDowell Breckinridge (1872–1920), women's suffragette leader and reformer
 Madge Gill (1882–1961), English outsider and visionary artist
 Madge Miller Green (1900–1989), American politician and educator
 Madge Knight (1895–1974), English artist
 Madge Oberholtzer (1896–1925), American woman raped and murdered by the Grand Dragon of the Indiana Klan
 Madge Oliver (1875–1924), British artist 
 Margaret and Mary Shelton (1510/15–1570/71), once thought to be sisters, but now believed to be the same person; may have been a mistress of King Henry VIII of England
 Madge Syers (born Florence Madeline Syers; 1881–1917), British figure skater, first woman to compete at the World Figure Skating Championships
 Madge Tennent (1889–1972), British-American painter considered the greatest individual contributor to 20th-century Hawaiian art 

Fictional characters:
 Madge, a long-running advertising character for Palmolive dishwashing detergent portrayed by Jan Miner
 Madge Allsop, long-suffering bridesmaid and longtime companion of Dame Edna Everage (played by actress Emily Perry)
 Madge Bishop, one of the matriarchs of the Australian soap opera Neighbours
 Madge Harvey, on the ITV programme Benidorm
 Madge, a character in the children's television show It's a Big Big World
Madge Madsen, a character in the TV show The Office.
 Madge Owens, in the play Picnic and the 1955 film Picnic
 Madge Undersee, a character in the Hunger Games trilogy
 Madge Weinstein, fictional Internet personality, creation and alter ego of underground filmmaker Richard Bluestein
 Madge Wildfire, in Sir Walter Scott's novel The Heart of Midlothian

References 

English feminine given names
Given names derived from gemstones
Hypocorisms